Jørgen Munk Plum (16 July 1925 – 11 April 2011) was a Danish athlete. He competed in the men's discus throw at the 1952 Summer Olympics.

References

1925 births
2011 deaths
Athletes (track and field) at the 1952 Summer Olympics
Danish male discus throwers
Olympic athletes of Denmark
Place of birth missing